Giuliano Ferraris (16 February 1935 – 7 February 2016) was an Italian ice hockey player. He competed in the men's tournament at the 1956 Winter Olympics.

References

External links
 

1935 births
2016 deaths
Ice hockey players at the 1956 Winter Olympics
Italian ice hockey players
Olympic ice hockey players of Italy
Ice hockey people from Bolzano